Wahlenbergia gracilis, common name Australian bluebell, is an Asian wildflower from the family Campanulaceae. It also grows on western Pacific Ocean islands.

See also
 List of vascular plants of Norfolk Island
 Sydney Turpentine-Ironbark Forest
 Flora of the Houtman Abrolhos
 Flora of New South Wales

References

gracilis
Flora of New South Wales
Flora of the Northern Territory
Flora of Queensland
Flora of South Australia
Flora of Tasmania
Flora of Victoria (Australia)